In Inuit mythology, Aipaloovik is an evil sea god associated with death and destruction. He is considered the opposite of Anguta. He is a danger to all fishermen.

References

Death gods
Inuit gods
Sea and river gods